The Reading Buccaneers Drum and Bugle Corps is an all-age drum and bugle corps based in Reading, Pennsylvania. This ensemble is a charter member of Drum Corps Associates.

History

Pre-DCA (VFW/American Legion)
The Reading Buccaneers drum and bugle corps was formed in August 1957 by bugler Bruce Englehart and three friends as a parade corps for World War II veterans. A field corps was formed in 1958, which competed in the VFW circuit. The Reading Buccaneers captured the VFW championship in 1960, 1961, and 1962. 

In 1962, the corps was composed of a forty-two-member horn line, twelve-member drum section and an eighteen-member color guard. Its brass instrumentalists used Getzen twin-piston horns. Members of the ensemble wore "brilliant blue satin and black" buccaneer-style uniforms with silver trim and black "flat-crowned" hats with white ostrich feather plumes.

The Reading Buccaneers was the last drum and bugle corps to win the VFW championship as the award was retired in 1962.

Modern Years (DCA)
In 1965, the Reading Buccaneers became a charter member of Drum Corps Associates. The Buccaneers won the first  DCA Open Class World Champions in 1965. The ensemble has since repeated sixteen times, in 1968, 1979, 1980, 2005, 2006, 2007 (the corps' 50th anniversary), 2008, 2009, 2010, 2012, 2013, 2014, 2015, 2017 (the corps' 60th anniversary), 2018, and 2019. The corps won the first DCA World Class Championship title in 2022. The corps has also placed second nine times (1973, 1974, 1976, 1984, 1985, 1999, 2001, 2011, and 2016) and third seven times (1972, 1975, 1977, 1981, 2000, 2002, and 2004). It has missed being a DCA finalist only three times.

Traditions

The official corps nickname is "The Balance in Blue" because of the variety of musical styles it has presented over the years, although the corps has programmed mostly classical choices since the late 1990s. The official corps symbol is a ship's wheel in blue with a falchion laid horizontal with the name of the corps. The official corps song is sung to the theme of An Affair to Remember. "Beyond the Sea" is also an unofficial corps song.

References

External links
 
 Buccaneer Alumni Association

Drum Corps Associates corps
Reading, Pennsylvania
Veterans of Foreign Wars
1957 establishments in Pennsylvania
Musical groups established in 1957